Joachim Johansson was the defending champion, but did not participate.

Kenneth Carlsen won the title, defeating Max Mirnyi in the final 7–5, 7–5.

Seeds

Draw

Finals

Top half

Bottom half

References

External links
Draw
Qualifying Draw

2005 ATP Tour
2005 WTA Tour
2000 Singles